The Phantom Horseman is a 1924 American silent Western film directed by Robert North Bradbury and written by Isadore Bernstein. The film stars Jack Hoxie, Lillian Rich, Neil McKinnon, Wade Boteler, William McCall, and Ben Corbett. The film was released on March 3, 1924, by Universal Pictures.

Plot
As described in a film magazine review, Sheriff Bob Winton promises to capture "The Hawk," a night riding bandit. The stage coach is robbed of gold owned by loan shark Jefferson Williams, who has the mortgage on run by Dorothy Mason and her scape-grace brother Fred. The Williams safe is robbed and Bob arrests Fred. In order to save the brother of the young woman he loves, Bob asserts that he is the Hawk. However, Fred commits suicide and leaves behind a note admitting that he is the outlaw. This clears Bob who then thrashes Williams and wins the affection of Dorothy.

Cast

References

External links
 
 

1924 films
1920s English-language films
1924 Western (genre) films
Universal Pictures films
Films directed by Robert N. Bradbury
American black-and-white films
Silent American Western (genre) films
1920s American films